Alec Fyfe (12 August 1909 – 1 December 1973) was an Australian rules footballer who played for the Collingwood Football Club in the Victorian Football League (VFL).

Notes

External links 

		
Alec Fyfe's profile at Collingwood Forever

1909 births
1973 deaths
Australian rules footballers from Melbourne
Collingwood Football Club players
Camberwell Football Club players